The men's 110 metres hurdles event at the 1999 Summer Universiade was held at the Estadio Son Moix in Palma de Mallorca, Spain on 8 and  9 July.

Medalists

Results

Heats
Wind:Heat 1: +2.5 m/s, Heat 2: +2.5 m/s, Heat 3: +1.5 m/s, Heat 4: +1.5 m/s, Heat 5: +3.2 m/s

Semifinals
Wind:Heat 1: -1.2 m/s, Heat 2: -2.1 m/s, Heat 3: -2.1 m/s

Final
Wind: -0.1 m/s

References

Athletics at the 1999 Summer Universiade
1999